Jaszczurowa  is a village in the administrative district of Gmina Mucharz, within Wadowice County, Lesser Poland Voivodeship, in southern Poland.

The village has a population of 1,000. The place was established probably after 1333 and was first mentioned in 1389 as a private village in the Duchy of Auschwitz.

References

Jaszczurowa